The women's 10,000 metres at the 2022 World Athletics Championships was held at the Hayward Field in Eugene on 16 July 2022.

Records
Before the competition records were as follows:

Qualification standard
The standard to qualify automatically for entry was 31:25.00.

Schedule
The event schedule, in local time (UTC−7), was as follows:

Results

References

10,000
10,000 metres at the World Athletics Championships